Kabul Tower, also referred to as the MOC Tower and Telecom Tower, is an 18-story brutalist high-rise building in Kabul, Afghanistan built in the 1970s. With a height of 87 metres (285 ft) to the tip and an architectural height of 75 metres (246 ft), the Kabul Tower was for a long time the tallest building in Afghanistan until being eclipsed by the Kabul Markaz Residential Tower 1 in 2020. Kabul Tower is a government office building and serves as the Headquarters of the  Ministry of Communications and Information Technology

See also 
 List of tallest buildings and structures in Afghanistan

References 

Skyscrapers in Afghanistan
Government of Afghanistan